BS3 or BS-3 may refer to :
 BS3, a BS postcode area for Bristol, England
 BS3, a center drill bit size
 100 mm field gun M1944 (BS-3), a 1944 Soviet gun
 BisSulfosuccinimidyl suberate, a crosslinker used in biological research
 Bežigrad neighbourhood number 3, a living settlement in Ljubljana, Slovenia
 B-s3, a variant of the Antonov A-1 aircraft
 BS 3, Report on Influence of Gauge Length and Section of Test Bar on the Percentage of Elongation, a British Standard
 BS-III Bharat Stage emission standards in India
 BS3, a brass right-hand threaded Gas cylinder valve

See also
BS-3A, a Yuri (satellite)